The 1939–40 Montreal Canadiens season was the 31st season in franchise history. The team placed seventh in the regular season and did not qualify for the playoffs for the first time since the 1935–36 season. The Canadiens would not finish a season in last place in their division for another 59 years, and would not finish last in the league for another 82 years.

Regular season
The Canadiens' first game saw them score what would be a season-high 8 goals as they defeated the Chicago Black Hawks 8–2 at the Montreal Forum on November 5, 1939. The Habs were undefeated over their first six games (4-0-2) and were 6-2-2 in their first ten. After that, however, long winless streaks were the rule. They went 3-8-0 in December, 1-10-1 in January, 1-8-1 in February and 1-5-1 in March. Their most lopsided loss happened on February 22, 1940 – 1–10 against the Chicago Black Hawks at Chicago.

Final standings

Record vs. opponents

Schedule and results

Player statistics

Regular season
Scoring

Goaltending

Awards and records

Transactions

Playoffs
They didn't qualify for the playoffs

See also
 1939–40 NHL season

References
Canadiens on Hockey Database
Canadiens on NHL Reference

Montreal Canadiens seasons
Montreal
Montreal